The Stone Rider is a 1923 German silent drama film directed by Fritz Wendhausen and starring Rudolf Klein-Rogge, Lucie Mannheim and Gustav von Wangenheim. It was shot at the Babelsberg Studios in Berlin.

Cast
 Rudolf Klein-Rogge as Der Herr vom Berge
 Lucie Mannheim as Hirtin
 Gustav von Wangenheim as Jäger
 Georg John as Pförtner
 Emilia Unda as Schaffnerin
 Grete Berger as Mutter der Hirtin
 Wilhelm Diegelmann as Lautensänger
 Paul Biensfeldt as Pförtner
 Otto Framer as Begleiter des Herrn vom Berge
 Emil Heyse as Befreundete Burgherr
 Fritz Kampers
 Martin Lübbert as Bräutigam
 Anni Mewes as Braut
 Hans Sternberg as Kellermeister des Burgherrn
 Erika von Thellmann

References

Bibliography
 Bock, Hans-Michael & Bergfelder, Tim. The Concise CineGraph. Encyclopedia of German Cinema. Berghahn Books, 2009.

External links

1923 films
1923 drama films
German drama films
Films of the Weimar Republic
German silent feature films
Films directed by Fritz Wendhausen
Films set in the Middle Ages
UFA GmbH films
Films with screenplays by Thea von Harbou
German black-and-white films
Films produced by Erich Pommer
Films with screenplays by Fritz Wendhausen
Silent drama films
1920s German films
Films shot at Babelsberg Studios